The International Children’s Festival is a fair that showcases international cultures. Diplomatic embassies host booths about their country and culture intended to introduce children and their families to world geography, dress, and traditions through displays and activities.  In addition to embassy-sponsored booths, the festival offers international dance and music performances, as well as opportunities to sample international cuisine. In 2009, Michelle Fenty, wife of DC Mayor Adrian M. Fenty, supported the festival by serving as Honorary Patron of the event.

The International Children’s Festival is held every May and is located in Meridian’s historic mansions.

Description

Embassies host booths at the Festival, allowing visitors to experience another culture. Embassies bring artifacts, displays, and activities about their country and culture.   Food and drink samples are present at each booth, as well as crafts and activities. Booth activities have included trying on traditional Indonesian dress, stamping Kente cloth (Ghana), folding origami (Japan), writing hieroglyphics (Egypt), creating Carnival masks (Brazil), exploring Mexican children's toys and more.

Participating Embassies 2010
Argentina, Australia, Bahamas, Bahrain, Brazil, China, El Salvador, Fiji, France, Ghana, Greece, Hungary, Indonesia, Israel, Japan, Liechtenstein, Mexico, Senegal, South Africa, Switzerland, Turkey, Zambia, as well as representation from the United Nations.

Performances

In addition to the interactive booths sponsored by embassies, the Festival exhibits dance performances from local and international artists.

Other Educational Outreach Programs

International Classroom
 The International Children’s Festival is a part of Meridian’s educational outreach initiatives.

International Resource Library
International Classroom offers teachers resources to help them include more international education in their curricula.  Meridian has Culture Boxes that contain items from a specific country or region to help aid learning.

Teacher Workshops
International Classroom also offers a professional development workshop,  Passports to the World, for DC teachers each fall on how to internationalize their curricula while meeting current Standards of Learning.

References

(1) Meridian International Center 
(2) Meridian International Center Photo Gallery
(3) DC About.com
(4) Embassy of Indonesia
(5) DC Urban Mom
(6) Cultural Tourism DC

Children's festivals in the United States
Festivals in Washington, D.C.